Čerťák is a ski jumping stadium with two hills located in the town of Harrachov in the Czech Republic.

It was built in 1979 and both hill officially opened in 1980. The venue is most notable for being one of five ski flying hills in the world, though it also has three smaller hills close by. It is owned by the sports club TJ Jiskra Harrachov. Audience capacity is about 50,000. Despite being a flying hill, only two world records have ever set at Čerťák, both in the 1980s. It was also during this time, and into the early 1990s, that many horrific accidents occurred.

The hills
The hills are located on the north side of the mountain Čertová Hora, not far from the border to Poland. The first hill in Harrachov was built in 1922, but at a different location in town. Later in the 1920s the first hill in Čerťák was built. It was eventually expanded and supplemented with more hills. The ski flying hill was built in 1979 and opened in March 1980.

The large hill in Harrachov was built at the same time as the ski flying hill, and renovated in 1992. This hill has a K-point of 125 m and a hill size of 142 m. The official record is 145.5 m, set by Janne Ahonen on 12 December 2004 during the 2004–05 World Cup season. The unofficial record is 151 m set by Martin Koch (Austria) on 17 December 2004 in a Continental Cup event.

The normal hill has K-point of 90 m, a hill size of 100 m and a hill record of 102.5 m. The two smaller hills have K-points of 70 m (hill record 77 m) and K-point 40 meters (hill record 43.5 m). The standard hill has plastic mats, allowing summer use.

The ski flying hill in Harrachov garnered an early reputation of being quite dangerous from which to jump. In its early years, jumpers achieved a significant height over the knoll, up to 12 m. The result of this height was that a gust of wind or error from the jumper could end catastrophically, and there were indeed many injuries from bad falls. During the World Championship in 1983, injuries were suffered by Steinar Bråten, Horst Bulau and Jens Weißflog. In 1985, Pavel Ploc suffered a violent crash. The venue was eventually closed by the FIS and rebuilt between 1989 and 1992, and has since kept the requirements from FIS. Accidents have still occurred, however: in 1992, Andreas Goldberger fell out of the air at the highest point of his jump and crashed very hard.

Events

Normal hill

Large hill

Flying hill

Hill record

Large hill

Flying hill

Official

Invalid 

Ski areas and resorts in the Czech Republic
Ski jumping venues in the Czech Republic
Ski flying venues
Sports venues in the Liberec Region
Sport in Harrachov
Sports venues completed in 1980
1980 establishments in Czechoslovakia
20th-century architecture in the Czech Republic